The women's road race of the 2022 UCI Road World Championships was a cycling event that took place on 24 September 2022 in Wollongong, Australia.

Qualification
Qualification was based mainly on the UCI World Ranking by nations as of 16 August 2022.

UCI World Rankings
The following nations qualified.

Continental champions

Final classification

References

Women's road race
UCI Road World Championships – Women's road race
2022 in women's road cycling